Édouard Boubat (13 September 1923 – 30 June 1999) was a French photojournalist and art photographer.

Life and work
Boubat was born in Montmartre, Paris. He studied typography and graphic arts at the École Estienne and worked for a printing company before becoming a photographer. In 1943, he was subjected to service du travail obligatoire, forced labour of French people in Nazi Germany, and witnessed some of the horrors of World War II. He took his first photograph after the war in 1946 and was awarded the Kodak Prize the following year. He travelled internationally for the French magazine Réalités, where his colleague was Jean-Philippe Charbonnier, and later worked as a freelance photographer. French poet Jacques Prévert called him a "peace correspondent" as he was humanist, apolitical and photographed uplifting subjects. His son Bernard Boubat is also a photographer.

Notable awards
1947 – Kodak Prize
1971 – David Octavius Hill Medal
1984 – Grand Prix National de la Photographie
1988 – Hasselblad Foundation International Award in Photography

Gallery

Exhibitions

Solo
 2 November – 23 December 2006: Les photographes de Réalités: Édouard Boubat, Jean-Philippe Charbonnier, Jean-Louis Swiners. Galerie Agathe Gaillard, Paris, France
 15 August – 1 October 2006: French masters: Edouard Boubat and Jean-Philippe Charbonnier. Duncan Miller Gallery, Los Angeles, USA
 1983 Ambassade de France, New York (USA)
 1982 Lausanne, Switzerland.
Witkin Gallery, New York (USA)
 1980 Musée d'Art Moderne, Paris
Lausanne Switzerland
 1979 Fondation Nationale de la Photographie. Lyon, France.
 1978 Musée d'Art Moderne Carilo, Mexico
Musée N. Niépce, France
Chalon s/Saône, France
Photographers' Gallery, London, UK
1976 Witkin Gallery, New York (USA) and travelling.
1975 Galerie du Château d'Eau, Toulouse, France
1973 Bibliothèque Nationale, Paris, France
 1971 India, Galerie Rencontre, Paris
 1967 Moderna Museet, Stockholm, Sweden
  22 November – 31 December 1954, Édouard Boubat, Limelight Gallery, New York, USA

Group
 1951 Galerie La Hune, Paris, France
 1949 Salon, Bibliothèque Nationale, Paris, France

Publications
Edouard Boubat: Pauses (Bookking International, 1988). .
Édouard Boubat (Centre national de la photographie, 1988). .
Photographies 1950–1987. (Éditions du Désastre, 1988). .
It's a Wonderful Life (Editions Assouline, 1997). .
Édouard Boubat: The Monograph. (Harry N. Abrams, Inc., 2004). .
Édouard Boubat: A Gentle Eye (Thames & Hudson, 2004). .

References

Further reading

External links

 Édouard Boubat at Luminous Lint
 Edouard Boubat and his Cat Photos

1923 births
1999 deaths
French photographers
Humanist photographers
French World War II forced labourers